The UK Chinese Ensemble is a Chinese music ensemble that was founded in 1994 by Chinese virtuosi resident in Britain. The ensemble seeks to promote a wide variety of traditional repertoires as well as exploring contemporary styles. In addition to regular concerts, the ensemble presents workshops and other out-reach activities. Since its founding, the ensemble has performed in several European countries. In the United Kingdom the ensemble has been featured at the Edinburgh International Festival, the Jersey Folk Music Festival and the Royal Festival Hall in London. Its members include pipa player Cheng Yu.

See also 

 Journey to the West (soundtrack) 2008 collaboration of the UK Chinese Ensemble with Damon Albarn

External links
UK Chinese Ensemble official site
Harmony Chinese Music Ensemble

Chinese musical groups
1994 establishments in the United Kingdom
Musical groups established in 1994
British musical groups